Fairview is a borough located in Bergen County, in the U.S. state of New Jersey. According to the 2020 United States census, the borough's population was 15,025, an increase of 1,190 (+8.6%) from the 2010 census count of 13,835, which in turn reflected an increase of 580 (+4.4%) from the 13,255 counted in the 2000 Census.

Fairview was formed on December 19, 1894, from portions of Ridgefield Township, based on the results of a referendum held the previous day. The borough was formed during the "Boroughitis" phenomenon then sweeping through Bergen County, in which 26 boroughs were formed in the county in 1894 alone. The borough is named for its view of the Hackensack River valley.

Geography
According to the United States Census Bureau, the borough had a total area of 0.85 square miles (2.19 km2), including 0.84 square miles (2.19 km2) of land and <0.01 square miles (<0.01 km2) of water (0.24%).

The borough borders the municipalities of Cliffside Park and Ridgefield in Bergen County; and North Bergen in Hudson County.

Fairview Cemetery and Mount Moriah Cemetery are located along the western slope of the Hudson Palisades.

Demographics

2010 census

The Census Bureau's 2006–2010 American Community Survey showed that (in 2010 inflation-adjusted dollars) median household income was $43,341 (with a margin of error of +/− $5,441) and the median family income was $53,285 (+/− $6,982). Males had a median income of $36,241 (+/− $8,067) versus $32,069 (+/− $7,902) for females. The per capita income for the borough was $22,477 (+/− $1,520). About 11.4% of families and 15.0% of the population were below the poverty line, including 17.2% of those under age 18 and 18.7% of those age 65 or over.

2000 census
As of the 2000 United States census there were 13,255 people, 4,861 households, and 3,179 families residing in the borough. The population density was 15,585.5 people per square mile (6,020.9/km2). There were 4,988 housing units at an average density of 5,865.0 per square mile (2,265.7/km2). The racial makeup of the borough was 72.46% White, 1.71% African American, 0.38% Native American, 4.97% Asian, 0.03% Pacific Islander, 12.92% from other races, and 7.53% from two or more races. 37.05% of the population were Hispanic or Latino of any race.

As of the 2000 Census, 4.6% of Fairview's residents identified themselves as being of Croatian ancestry. This was the 16th-highest percentage in the United States and the highest percentage of people with Croatian ancestry in any place in New Jersey with 1,000 or more residents identifying their ancestry. In the same census, 2.4% of Fairview's residents identified themselves as being of Armenian American ancestry, the 18th highest percentage of Armenian American people in any place in the United States with 1,000 or more residents identifying their ancestry. As of the 2000 Census, 1.9% of residents identified themselves as being of Turkish American ancestry, the third-highest of any municipality in the United States and second-highest in the state.

There were 4,861 households, out of which 30.0% had children under the age of 18 living with them, 47.3% were married couples living together, 11.5% had a female householder with no husband present, and 34.6% were non-families. 28.0% of all households were made up of individuals, and 11.8% had someone living alone who was 65 years of age or older. The average household size was 2.73 and the average family size was 3.31.

In the borough the population was spread out, with 21.1% under the age of 18, 11.5% from 18 to 24, 34.6% from 25 to 44, 19.0% from 45 to 64, and 13.8% who were 65 years of age or older. The median age was 34 years. For every 100 females, there were 106.8 males. For every 100 females age 18 and over, there were 105.7 males.

The median income for a household in the borough was $40,393, and the median income for a family was $46,365. Males had a median income of $35,000 compared to $29,905 for females. The per capita income for the borough was $18,835. 11.8% of the population and 9.3% of families were below the poverty line. Out of the total population, 14.2% of those under the age of 18 and 8.7% of those 65 and older were living below the poverty line.

Arts and culture
Musical groups from the borough include hardcore punk band Ripface Invasion.

Government

Local government
Fairview is governed under the Borough form of New Jersey municipal government, which is used in 218 municipalities (of the 564) statewide, making it the most common form of government in New Jersey. The governing body consists of a Mayor and a Borough Council, all of whom are elected on a partisan basis in the November general election. A Mayor is elected directly by the voters to a four-year term of office. The Borough Council is comprised of six members elected to serve three-year terms on a staggered basis, with two seats coming up for election each year in a three-year cycle. The form of government used by Fairview is a "weak mayor / strong council" type, where council members serves as the legislative body, while the mayor presides over meetings and only casts a vote in case of a tie. The mayor can veto ordinances subject to an override by a two-thirds majority vote of the council. The mayor makes committee and liaison assignments for council members, and most appointments are made by the mayor with the advice and consent of the council.

, the Mayor of Fairview is Democrat Vincent A. Bellucci Jr., whose term of office ends December 31, 2023. Members of the Fairview Borough Council are Violetta Berisha (D, 2025), Stephen Burke (D, 2023), Jhon Gomez (D, 2024), Albert Lukin (D, 2023), Russell Martin (D, 2025) and Stephen J. Russo (D, 2024).

In May 2017, the Borough Council selected Violetta Berisha to fill the seat expiring December 2019 that became vacant following the resignation of John Rossi. Berisha served on an interim basis until the November 2017 general election, when she was elected to serve the balance of the term of office.

Russell Martin was named in January 2012 to fill the council vacancy of the seat that had been held by John Pierotti following his death, and won the remainder of the term the 2012 General Election, running unopposed for the seat.

Federal, state, and county representation
Fairview is located in the 9th Congressional District and is part of New Jersey's 32nd state legislative district.

In redistricting following the 2010 census, the borough was in the 8th congressional district, which was in effect from 2013 to 2022.

Politics
As of March 2011, there were a total of 4,945 registered voters in Fairview, of which 2,374 (48.0% vs. 31.7% countywide) were registered as Democrats, 487 (9.8% vs. 21.1%) were registered as Republicans and 2,082 (42.1% vs. 47.1%) were registered as Unaffiliated. There were 2 voters registered as Libertarians or Greens. Among the borough's 2010 Census population, 35.7% (vs. 57.1% in Bergen County) were registered to vote, including 44.4% of those ages 18 and over (vs. 73.7% countywide).

In the 2012 presidential election, Democrat Barack Obama received 2,549 votes (71.6% vs. 54.8% countywide), ahead of Republican Mitt Romney with 944 votes (26.5% vs. 43.5%) and other candidates with 27 votes (0.8% vs. 0.9%), among the 3,562 ballots cast by the borough's 5,456 registered voters, for a turnout of 65.3% (vs. 70.4% in Bergen County). In the 2008 presidential election, Democrat Barack Obama received 2,608 votes (66.9% vs. 53.9% countywide), ahead of Republican John McCain with 1,193 votes (30.6% vs. 44.5%) and other candidates with 36 votes (0.9% vs. 0.8%), among the 3,899 ballots cast by the borough's 5,703 registered voters, for a turnout of 68.4% (vs. 76.8% in Bergen County). In the 2004 presidential election, Democrat John Kerry received 2,262 votes (62.9% vs. 51.7% countywide), ahead of Republican George W. Bush with 1,296 votes (36.0% vs. 47.2%) and other candidates with 21 votes (0.6% vs. 0.7%), among the 3,599 ballots cast by the borough's 5,661 registered voters, for a turnout of 63.6% (vs. 76.9% in the whole county).

In the 2013 gubernatorial election, Democrat Barbara Buono received 55.3% of the vote (976 cast), ahead of Republican Chris Christie with 43.5% (767 votes), and other candidates with 1.2% (22 votes), among the 1,862 ballots cast by the borough's 5,088 registered voters (97 ballots were spoiled), for a turnout of 36.6%. In the 2009 gubernatorial election, Democrat Jon Corzine received 1,445 ballots cast (63.7% vs. 48.0% countywide), ahead of Republican Chris Christie with 690 votes (30.4% vs. 45.8%), Independent Chris Daggett with 85 votes (3.7% vs. 4.7%) and other candidates with 17 votes (0.7% vs. 0.5%), among the 2,268 ballots cast by the borough's 5,356 registered voters, yielding a 42.3% turnout (vs. 50.0% in the county).

Education
The Fairview Public Schools serve students in pre-kindergarten through eighth grade. As of the 2018–19 school year, the district, comprised of three schools, had an enrollment of 1,507 students and 93.0 classroom teachers (on an FTE basis), for a student–teacher ratio of 16.2:1. Schools in the district (with 2018–19 enrollment data from the National Center for Education Statistics) are 
Lincoln School Annex with 232 students in grades Pre-K–K, 
Number 3 School / Number Three School Annex with 546 students in grades K–3 and 
Lincoln School with 667 students in grades 4–8.

For ninth through twelfth grades, public school students from Fairview attend Cliffside Park High School in Cliffside Park as part of a sending/receiving relationship with the Cliffside Park School District. As of the 2018–2019 school year, the high school had an enrollment of 1,196 students and 92.7 classroom teachers (on an FTE basis), for a student–teacher ratio of 12.9:1. The Fairview Board of Education appoints a representative to serve on the board of the Cliffside Park district.

Public school students from the borough, and all of Bergen County, are eligible to attend the secondary education programs offered by the Bergen County Technical Schools, which include the Bergen County Academies in Hackensack, and the Bergen Tech campus in Teterboro or Paramus. The district offers programs on a shared-time or full-time basis, with admission based on a selective application process and tuition covered by the student's home school district.

Transportation

Roads and highways

U.S. Route 1/9, Route 63 and County Route 501 travel through Fairview, with the southern terminus of Route 63 at Fairview.

Public transportation
Fairview is served by NJ Transit bus routes 127, 128, 154, 156, 159, 165, 166 and 168, which provide service to and from the Port Authority Bus Terminal in Midtown Manhattan; the 181 to the George Washington Bridge Bus Terminal; the 83 to Jersey City; and local service on the 751 and 755 routes. Many of these routes converge at the border with Hudson County at Nungessers.

The privately owned FT 9X operates between Nungesser's (at 90th Street and Bergenline Avenue) in North Bergen, Hudson County to the GWB Bus Terminal via Palisade Avenue; this last route passes through Fairview for one block between Hamilton Avenue / Woodcliff Avenue to Anderson Avenue / Woodcliff Avenue.

NJ Transit plans to extend the Hudson–Bergen Light Rail through Fairview as part of the Northern Branch Corridor Project, which would run along the Northern Branch right-of-way. The plans include a stop near the county line in North Bergen at 91st Street.

Notable people

People who were born in, residents of, or otherwise closely associated with Fairview include:
 Kyle Anderson (born 1993), UCLA Bruins basketball player who was selected in the first round of the 2014 NBA Draft by the San Antonio Spurs
 Simon Douglas (1843–1950), former slave who lived to become the last Civil War soldier in the state of New Jersey
 Vicki Genfan (born 1959), fingerstyle guitarist, composer and singer
 Hadi Matar (born ), alleged attacker of Salman Rushdie
 Caitlin Sanchez (born 1996), actress known as the voice of Dora on Dora the Explorer
 John Scarne (1903–1985), author, expert on gambling, card games and magic tricks

See also
 Havana on the Hudson
 USS Fairview

References

Sources

 Municipal Incorporations of the State of New Jersey (according to Counties) prepared by the Division of Local Government, Department of the Treasury (New Jersey); December 1, 1958.
 Clayton, W. Woodford; and Nelson, Nelson. History of Bergen and Passaic Counties, New Jersey, with Biographical Sketches of Many of its Pioneers and Prominent Men. Philadelphia: Everts and Peck, 1882.
 Harvey, Cornelius Burnham (ed.), Genealogical History of Hudson and Bergen Counties, New Jersey. New York: New Jersey Genealogical Publishing Co., 1900.
 Van Valen, James M. History of Bergen County, New Jersey. New York: New Jersey Publishing and Engraving Co., 1900.
 Westervelt, Frances A. (Frances Augusta), 1858–1942, History of Bergen County, New Jersey, 1630–1923, Lewis Historical Publishing Company, 1923.

External links

 Borough website
 Fairview Public Schools
 
 School Data for the Fairview Public Schools, National Center for Education Statistics

 
1894 establishments in New Jersey
Borough form of New Jersey government
Boroughs in Bergen County, New Jersey
Populated places established in 1894